is a Japanese band formed in 1992 in Tokyo and composed of drummer Atsuo, guitarist/bassist Takeshi, and guitarist/keyboardist Wata. All three members contribute vocals. Boris has released more than twenty studio albums on various labels around the world, as well as a wide variety of live albums, compilations, EPs, singles, and collaborative albums. They have collaborated with acts such as Sunn O))), Merzbow, Keiji Haino, and guitarist Michio Kurihara.

History
Boris was originally a four-piece band with Atsuo on lead vocals, Wata on guitar, Takeshi on bass, and Nagata on drums. The band is named after a song of the same name on the Melvins album Bullhead. Boris's debut album Absolutego was released in 1996 on their own record label Fangs Anal Satan. Nagata departed in 1996 and Atsuo switched to drums, while Wata expanded her duties to lead guitar and keyboards, and Takeshi took on bass and rhythm guitar duties on a double-necked instrument of his own design. All three adopted lead vocal duties, and the band has remained a three-piece ever since.

In Japan, Boris release most of their music on the indie label Inoxia Records. Though relatively unknown in their home country, a series of reissues of their early albums on the American label Southern Lord Records caused a surge of popularity in North America. Boris also collaborates with other artists regularly, first on the 1998 album Black: Implication Flooding with experimental musician Keiji Haino. They have released seven collaborative albums with noise artist Merzbow, and have released collaborative albums with international artists like Sunn O))) and Ian Astbury.

Their international popularity was bolstered by their 2005 album Pink, which was met with considerable critical praise and a strong response from music fans when reissued in the US on Southern Lord. Blender magazine and SPIN magazine both named it one of 2006's best albums. The album also topped the metal section of Canadian magazine Exclaim!s 2006 Reader's Poll, and it was named in the top 10 of Pitchfork Media's Top 50 Records of 2006. They also appeared on the avant-garde metal soundtrack to Jim Jarmusch's film The Limits of Control in 2009. Regarding Boris, Jarmusch said that "what's really remarkable is when they play live they're in the mode, in a way, of jazz musicians, not structurally or musically, but the way they listen to what the others are doing and build on it. Each time they play something it's obviously different, every time."

Boris focus a lot of their time on touring. In an interview, Atsuo said:

Boris received additional international exposure when they opened for Nine Inch Nails on part of the 2008 segment of the Lights in the Sky tour. From 2011 to 2017, they released several albums on Sargent House Records, and continue to reissue previous albums in new formats. In 2017, the band's 25th anniversary, they considered retirement after one final album. However, a successful songwriting and recording process for that album, Dear, encouraged the band to continue. While self-isolating during the COVID-19 pandemic, Boris self-released the rock-oriented album NO and the ambient album W, with the two constituting a project called NOW. Their third album titled Heavy Rocks, featuring explorations of hard rock and heavy metal sounds, was released in August 2022. During an American tour to support the album, drummer Atsuo adopted the role of frontman (which he had rarely done since the 1990s), performing most lead vocals, while Mike Engle of the band Crawl performed as guest drummer. In December 2022, Boris released their third studio album of the year, Fade, which focuses on drone metal and appeared with no prior notice.

Musical style and equipment
Throughout their career, Boris have made deliberate efforts to avoid a strong association with any musical style. In particular, they do not consider themselves a heavy metal band despite frequently being categorized as such. In an interview, drummer Atsuo stated: "Having some kind of preconceived message or theme is very boring to me. It becomes a crutch. Just say what you want to say."The wide variety of genres used by reviewers to describe Boris's music include experimental music, experimental rock, noise music, noise rock, experimental/avant-garde metal, doom metal, post-metal, drone metal, sludge metal, psychedelic music, psychedelic rock, psychedelic metal, and stoner rock. While they first emerged as a sludge metal band with strong hardcore punk influences, their subsequent releases have employed elements of a wide variety of genres, including drone music, old-school industrial music, ambient music, acid rock, garage rock, shoegazing, dream pop, J-pop, and crust punk.

For example, the band's debut album Absolutego featured a "65-minute track of oozing, slow motion, Melvins-inspired drone rock/metal," while its follow-up Amplifier Worship incorporated psychedelia and jam band influences. Their third album Flood incorporated elements from drone. Akuma no Uta and Pink engaged in different stylistic experimentation, including shoegazing, stoner rock, and post-rock. Vein (2007) was released in "Hardcore" and "Noise" versions, whereas New Album experimented with electronica and dream pop. The album Noise featured elements from grunge music.

Boris uses many different effects pedals and other guitar accessories while performing live. Wata uses an E-bow to achieve bow-like sounds or to manipulate feedback; this device is held in the hand, like a pick, but relies on a magnetic field vibration to move the guitar's strings. Wata also occasionally plays an accordion and keyboards in concert. Takeshi typically plays a double-necked bass/guitar live, which allows him to play both rhythm guitar during the band's lengthier tracks as well as bass guitar during their more traditional tracks, without needing to switch instruments.

In the studio, Boris records on analog equipment. They use minimal overdubs, recording mostly live.

Members
Current
Takeshi – vocals, bass guitar, rhythm guitar (1992–present)
Wata – vocals, lead guitar, keyboards (1992–present)
Atsuo – vocals (1992–present), drums, tambourine, electronics (1996–present)

Former
Nagata – drums (1992–1996)

Support/touring musicians
Michio Kurihara – guitars (2007–2012)
Mike Engle – drums (2019, 2022)

Timeline

Discography

Studio albums
 Absolutego (1996)
 Amplifier Worship (1998)
 Flood (2000)
 Heavy Rocks (2002)
 Akuma no Uta (2003)
 Boris at Last -Feedbacker- (2003)
 The Thing Which Solomon Overlooked (2004)
 Dronevil (2005)
 Soundtrack from the Film Mabuta no Ura (2005)
 Pink (2005)
 The Thing Which Solomon Overlooked 2 (2006)
 The Thing Which Solomon Overlooked 3 (2006)
 Vein (2006)
 Smile (2008)
 New Album (2011)
 Heavy Rocks (2011)
 Attention Please (2011)
 Präparat (2013)
 Noise (2014)
 The Thing Which Solomon Overlooked Extra (2014)
 Urban Dance (2015)
 Warpath (2015)
 Asia (2015)
 Dear (2017)
 Love & Evol (2019)
 NO (2020)
 W (2022)
 Heavy Rocks (2022)
 Fade (2022)

Collaboration albums
 Black: Implication Flooding (w/ Keiji Haino, 1998)
 Megatone (w/ Merzbow, 2002)
 04092001 (w/ Merzbow, 2004)
 Sun Baked Snow Cave (w/ Merzbow, 2005)
 Altar (w/ Sunn O))), 2006)
 Rainbow (w/ Michio Kurihara, 2006/2007)
 Walrus/Groon (w/ Merzbow, 2007)
 Rock Dream (live, w/ Merzbow, 2007)
 Cloud Chamber (w/ Michio Kurihara, 2008)
 BXI (w/ Ian Astbury, 2010)
 Klatter (w/ Merzbow, 2011)
 EROS (w/ Endon, 2015)
 Gensho (w/ Merzbow, 2016)
 Refrain (w/ Z.O.A., 2020)
 2R0I2P0 (w/ Merzbow, 2020)

References

External links

Official website

Southern Records: Boris Bio
The StonerRock.com Guide to Boris

1992 establishments in Japan
Japanese avant-garde metal musical groups
Japanese doom metal musical groups
Japanese experimental rock groups
Japanese musical trios
Japanese noise rock groups
Japanese psychedelic rock music groups
Musical groups established in 1992
Musical groups from Tokyo
Southern Lord Records artists
Third Man Records artists
Drone metal musical groups